Citharichthys mariajorisae, the five-rayed sanddab, is a species of flatfish in the large-tooth flounder family Paralichthyidae. It is native to the eastern Pacific Ocean, in tropical waters ranging from the Gulf of California in the north to the Bay of Panama in the south.

Like the rest of the large-tooth flounders, it has both eyes on the left side of its head. It is brownish or grey in color, mottled with darker patches. Its common name is derived from five or six pelvic-fin rays on the ocular side.

Citharichthys mariajorisae is a predator, feeding on benthic worms and crustaceans, as well as small fish.

References

Froese, Rainer, and Daniel Pauly, eds. (2010). "Citharichthys mariajorisae" in FishBase. August 2010 version.

Citharichthys
Western Central American coastal fauna
Fish described in 1995